Homaloxestis horochlora is a moth in the family Lecithoceridae. It was described by Edward Meyrick in 1929. It is found in southern India.

The wingspan is about 15 mm. The forewings are uniform rather dark fuscous with the costa slenderly whitish ochreous from the base to the apex. The hindwings are grey.

References

Moths described in 1929
Homaloxestis